Hidayat TV is an Islamic satellite TV Channel based in the United Kingdom. It is notable for being the first Shia Muslim channel in the United Kingdom and Europe and its website is banned by the United States with links with the Iranian regime.

According to the mission statement on its website the objectives of Hidayat TV includes developing the Muslim community by covering various educational, welfare and religious needs.

Hidayat TV was established by two Islamic scholars Moulana Gulam Hussain Adeel and Maulana Syed Abbas Abedi along with Dr. Gulam Hadi Kadiwal and Sakhawat Hussain Shah.
Hidayat TV initially aired parts daily but became a full-time 24-hour running channel from 16 February 2009.

Hidayat TV launched globally on 5 December 2009 reaching audiences in UK, Europe and parts of North Africa via Eutelsat 28A. From 7 February to 19 February 2014 the channel was temporarily removed from Sky.

Channel name

The channel name Hidayat TV refers to the Arabic word Hidayat which literally means Guidance. It is a term used repeatedly in the Quran referring to divine guidance.

Mission statement

According to its website the channel mission and objectives include the following:

 To educate the Islamic Community on its rights and responsibilities
 To assist the Islamic Community in the resolution of its social, economic, cultural and religious needs
 To create and promote the spirit of unity and brotherhood among the members of the Community and settle disputes
 To promote actively the principle of multiculturalism
 To provide a wider platform for those who love to establish peace and harmony on earth
 To show the real face of the Holy Quran and Sunnah according to the teachings of the Holy Prophet Mohammed and his Holy Progeny
 To build a bridge between Western and Eastern culture through healthy dialogues and debates
 To present educational, social, cultural, physical, ethical and religious programs for ALL

Coverage of Islamic events

Hidayat TV regularly airs live and recorded events from Islamic gatherings and Islamic Pilgrimages.

Poems and recitals are aired including remembrance of the prophet Muhammad and his closest progeny and commemorations of the martyrdom of Imam Hussain and other Shia Imams.

There are also frequent broadcasts of popular Islamic prayers in particular Dua-e-Kumail and Dua-e-Tawassul.

Main regular programmes

The main regular programs are:

 Tareekh-e-Islam
 Ahkam-e-Deen
 Islami Akhlaq
 Payam-e-Quran
 Quran aur hum
 Sahifa-e-Sajjadiyah
 Merajul Momin
 Pareshaniyun ka hal
 Intezar-e-Faraj
 Subh e Hidayat
 Future Stars
 Hidayat for Youth
 Khawateen-e-Islam
 Baseerat
 Tarbiyat-e-Aulad
 Makarim-e-AKhlaq
 Kijiye Sawaal
 Aqeedat ke phool
 Jaza o Saza
 Islamic Quiz
 Precious pearls
 The Big Picture Live
 Little Angels
 Maqam-e-Sahaba
 Sports Talk
 Hidayat TV Update
 Hadees Shanasi
 Muzakra
 Tajzia
 Tussa ni Awaz
 Hidayat Sunday Magazine
Suburus

Naat Competition

Subhe Zindagi

External links
Hidayat TV website

Religious television channels in the United Kingdom
Islamic television networks
Television channels and stations established in 2008
British Pakistani mass media